Yevgeny Kafelnikov was the defending champion but lost in the semifinals to Thomas Enqvist.

Enqvist won in the final 6–7(4–7), 6–3, 6–1 against Nicolas Escudé.

Seeds

  Juan Carlos Ferrero (quarterfinals)
  Yevgeny Kafelnikov (semifinals)
  Sébastien Grosjean (quarterfinals)
  Thomas Johansson (first round)
  Tim Henman (withdrew)
  Roger Federer (withdrew)
  Younes El Aynaoui (first round, retired because of bronchitis)
  Hicham Arazi (second round)

Draw

Finals

Top half

Bottom half

External links
 2002 Open 13 Singles draw

Open 13
2002 ATP Tour